G Centauri is a single star in the southern constellation of Centaurus. It is visible to the naked eye as a faint, blue-white hued star with an apparent visual magnitude of +4.82. This object is located approximately 450 light years from the Sun, based on parallax. It is a member of the Lower Centaurus–Crux group of the Scorpius–Centaurus association, with the former having an age of about 17 million years.

This object is a B-type main-sequence star with a stellar classification of B3V(n), where the 'n' indicates "nebulous" (broad) lines due to rapid rotation. It is around 16 million years old with a projected rotational velocity of up to 298 km/s. The star has six times the mass of the Sun and 3.4 times the Sun's radius.

References 

B-type main-sequence stars
Circumstellar disks

Centaurus (constellation)
Centauri, G
Durchmusterung objects
108257
060710
4732
Lower Centaurus Crux